Danijel Subotić (born 31 January 1989) is a Swiss footballer who plays for Rapperswil-Jona.

Career

Beginning
Subotić was born in Zagreb, SR Croatia, but his family originated from Doboj, Bosnia and Herzegovina, all back then part of Yugoslavia. His younger brother Dejan (born in 1996) is also footballer, having signed his first professional contract in 2018 with Serbian club FK Rad.

Danijel Subotić began his career at FC Basel in his adoptive country Switzerland.

Portsmouth
On 7 January 2008, he became English Premier League side Portsmouth F.C.'s first signing in the 2008 January transfer window. He signed a reported -year contract.

On 5 August 2008, Subotić moved on loan to Belgian club Zulte Waregem, the Portsmouth's feeder club at that time (which relationship ended in June 2009) along with Andréa Mbuyi-Mutombo in order to gain first-team experience. He scored 1 goal in 13 league appearances before returned to England in January 2009.

On 7 August 2010, Italian Serie B side Grosseto announced Subotić was trying out at the club. Nearly 2 weeks later, Pompey formally announced Subotić's contract was canceled by mutual consent.

Universitatea Craiova
In February 2011, Danijel Subotić signed a contract with the Romanian club FC Universitatea Craiova of Liga 1. On 20 March 2011, he scored his first goal for FC Universitatea Craiova during the match against FC Astra Ploieşti.

In July 2011, Subotić went on trial with Scottish Premier League side St Johnstone, where he played in one friendly match in an attempt to win a contract.

Gabala
On 1 July 2013, Subotić signed a one-year contract with Azerbaijan Premier League side Gabala. However Subotić could not feature in any of Gabala's opening five matches as there was a dispute over the players registration between Volyn Lutsk and Gabala, which was finally sorted out during the September International break.
Subotić made his debut and scored his first goal for Gabala on 15 September 2013 in a 2–1 away victory over AZAL.
 On 19 February 2014, Subotić scored his tenth goal for Gabala in only his sixteenth game.

Qadsia SC
Rejecting a new contract with Gabala, Subotić signed instead for Kuwaiti team Qadsia in July 2014.
He won 3 titles and scored 31 goals in 28 matches but left the club at the end of the season.

Sheriff Tiraspol
On 23 July 2015, Subotić signed for Moldovan side Sheriff Tiraspol, leaving the club by mutual consent on 28 January 2017.

Gabala Return
On 31 January 2017, Gabala announced the signing of Subotić on a six-month contract. Subotić left Gabala at the end of his contract.

Ulsan Hyundai
On 11 July 2017, Subotić signed a one-year contract with Ulsan Hyundai.

Shakhter Karagandy
On 28 March 2018, Shakhter Karagandy announced the signing of Subotić.

Dinamo București
On 11 September 2018, Dinamo București announced the signing of Subotić.

Rapperswil-Jona
After not playing for two seasons, on 28 July 2022 Subotić signed with Rapperswil-Jona in the third-tier Swiss Promotion League.

International career
Subotić has dual citizenship, Swiss as well as Bosnian. However his Croatian background also helped him eligible to play for all three.

Subotić represented Swiss U19 team at 2008 UEFA European Under-19 Football Championship qualification.

Career statistics

Honours

Club
Qadsia SC
 Kuwait Emir Cup (1): 2014–15
 Kuwait Super Cup (1): 2014
 AFC Cup (1): 2014

Sheriff Tiraspol
 Moldovan National Division (1): 2015–16
 Moldovan Super Cup (1): 2016

Individual
 Moldovan National Division Top scorer (1): 2015–16 (12 goals)

References

External links
 
 

Footballers from Zagreb
1989 births
Living people
Association football forwards
Swiss men's footballers
Switzerland youth international footballers
Swiss expatriate footballers
FC Basel players
Portsmouth F.C. players
S.V. Zulte Waregem players
F.C. Grosseto S.S.D. players
FC U Craiova 1948 players
ASA 2013 Târgu Mureș players
FC Volyn Lutsk players
FC Sheriff Tiraspol players
Gabala FC players
Ulsan Hyundai FC players
FC Shakhter Karagandy players
FC Dinamo București players
Grasshopper Club Zürich players
FC Rapperswil-Jona players
Belgian Pro League players
Serie B players
Liga I players
Ukrainian Premier League players
Moldovan Super Liga players
K League 1 players
Kazakhstan Premier League players
Swiss Challenge League players
Swiss Promotion League players
Expatriate footballers in Belgium
Expatriate footballers in Italy
Expatriate footballers in Romania
Expatriate footballers in Ukraine
Expatriate footballers in Moldova
Expatriate footballers in Azerbaijan
Bosnia and Herzegovina expatriate sportspeople in Romania
Swiss expatriate sportspeople in England
Swiss expatriate sportspeople in Italy
Swiss expatriate sportspeople in Romania
Swiss expatriate sportspeople in Ukraine
Swiss expatriate sportspeople in Moldova
Serbs of Croatia
Swiss people of Bosnia and Herzegovina descent
Swiss people of Serbian descent
AFC Cup winning players